Ruth Carol Hussey (October 30, 1911 - April 19, 2005) was an American actress best known for her Academy Award-nominated role as photographer Elizabeth Imbrie in The Philadelphia Story.

Early life
Hussey was born in Providence, Rhode Island, on October 30, 1911. She was later known as Ruth Carol O'Rourke, her stepfather's surname. Her father, George R. Hussey, died of the Spanish flu in 1918 when she was seven years old. Ten years later, her mother, Julia Corbett Hussey, married a family friend, William O'Rourke, who had worked at the family's mail-order silver enterprise. She grew up at 179 Ontario Street. She had an older brother, Robert, and a younger sister, Betty.

After obtaining her early education in Providence's public schools, Hussey studied art at Pembroke College and graduated from that institution in 1936. She never landed a role in any of the plays for which she tried out at Pembroke. She then received a degree in theatre from the University of Michigan School of Drama, and worked as an actress with a summer stock company in Michigan for two seasons. She also attended Boston Business College.

Career

After working as an actress in summer stock, she returned to Providence and worked as a radio fashion commentator on a local station. She wrote the ad copy for a Providence clothing store and read it on the radio each afternoon. She was encouraged by a friend to try out for acting roles at the Providence Playhouse. The theater director there turned her down, saying the roles were cast only out of New York City. Later that week, she journeyed to New York City and on her first day there, she signed with a talent agent who booked her for a role in a play starting the next day back at the Providence Playhouse.

In New York City, she also worked for a time as a model. She then landed a number of stage roles with touring companies. Dead End toured the country in 1937 and the last theater on the road trip was at the Biltmore Hotel in Los Angeles, where she was spotted on opening night by MGM talent scout Billy Grady.  MGM signed her to a players contract and she made her film debut in 1937. She quickly became a leading lady in MGM's "B" unit, usually playing sophisticated, worldly roles. For a 1940 "A" picture role, she was nominated for an Academy Award for her turn as Elizabeth Imbrie, the cynical magazine photographer and almost-girlfriend of James Stewart's character Macaulay Connor in The Philadelphia Story. In 1941, exhibitors voted her the third-most-popular new star in Hollywood.

Hussey also worked with Robert Taylor in Flight Command (1940), Robert Young in Northwest Passage (1940) and H. M. Pulham, Esq. (1941), Van Heflin in Tennessee Johnson (1942), Ray Milland in The Uninvited (1944), and Alan Ladd in The Great Gatsby (1949).

In 1946, she starred on Broadway in the Pulitzer Prize-winning play State of the Union. Her 1949 role in Goodbye, My Fancy on Broadway caused a Billboard reviewer to write: "Miss Hussey brings a splendid aliveness and warmth to the lovely congresswoman...."

She filled in for Jean Arthur in the 1955 Lux Radio Theater presentation of Shane, playing Miriam Starrett, alongside the film’s original stars Alan Ladd and Van Heflin.

In 1960, she co-starred in The Facts of Life with Bob Hope. Hussey was also active in early television drama.

Personal life

On August 9, 1942, Hussey married talent agent and radio producer C. Robert "Bob" Longenecker (1909–2002) at Mission San Antonio de Pala in north San Diego County, California. Longenecker was born and raised in Lititz, Pennsylvania. They raised three children: George Robert Longenecker, John William Longenecker, and Mary Elizabeth Hendrix.

Following the birth of her children, Hussey focused much of her attention on family activities and, in 1964, designed a family cabin in the mountain community of Lake Arrowhead, California. In 1967, she was inducted into the Rhode Island Heritage Hall of Fame.

In 1977, she and her husband moved from their Brentwood family home to Rancho Carlsbad in Carlsbad, California. Her husband died in 2002 shortly after celebrating their 60th wedding anniversary.

Her son, John Longenecker, works as a cinematographer and film director. He won an Academy Award for producing a live-action short film The Resurrection of Broncho Billy (1970).

She was also active in Catholic charities, was noted for painting in watercolors, and was a lifelong Democrat although she did vote for Republican Thomas Dewey in 1944 and for Hollywood friend and former co-star Ronald Reagan in the 1980 and 1984 presidential elections.

Death
Hussey died April 19, 2005, at the age of 93, from complications from an appendectomy. She is interred at Pierce Brothers Valley Oaks Memorial Park in Westlake Village, California.

Filmography

Radio appearances

References

External links

Ruth Hussey – official website

Ruth Hussey, a brief biography NY Times

1911 births
2005 deaths
20th-century American actresses
American film actresses
American radio actresses
American stage actresses
American television actresses
Articles containing video clips
Pembroke College in Brown University alumni
Brown University alumni
University of Michigan School of Music, Theatre & Dance alumni
People from Lake Arrowhead, California
Actors from Providence, Rhode Island
Metro-Goldwyn-Mayer contract players
People from Carlsbad, California
Burials in California
People from Brentwood, California
California Democrats
California Republicans
Catholics from California
Actresses from Rhode Island
21st-century American women
Burials at Valley Oaks Memorial Park